Tyler Morley (born December 19, 1991) is a Canadian professional ice hockey centre. He is currently playing for Grizzlys Wolfsburg in the Deutsche Eishockey Liga (DEL). He made his professional debut with the San Diego Gulls in the American Hockey League (AHL) after concluding a collegiate career in the NCAA Division I with the Alaska Nanooks.

Playing career
Morley attended University of Alaska Fairbanks where he played with the NCAA Division I hockey Alaska Nanooks. In his freshman year Morley's outstanding play was recognized when he was named to the 2012–13 CCHA All-Rookie Team, and in his junior year he was named to the 2014–15 WCHA First All-Star Team.

After spending his first full professional season with the San Diego Gulls in the American Hockey League in 2016–17, Morley opted to continue his career abroad in agreeing to a one-year deal with Croatian outfit, KHL Medveščak Zagreb of the EBEL on July 24, 2017.

Morley in his debut season in the Finnish Liiga with SaiPa, made an instant impact in the 2018–19 season, among the club's offensive leaders, he compiled 17 goals and 41 points in 57 games.

On May 20, 2019, Morley opted to continue in Finland, agreeing to a one-year contract with fellow Liiga club, Tappara.

In preparation for his sixth season abroad in Europe, Morley was signed as a free agent to a one-year contract with German club, Grizzlys Wolfsburg of the DEL, on June 3, 2022.

Career statistics

Awards and honours

References

External links 

1991 births
Living people
Alaska Nanooks men's ice hockey players
Canadian ice hockey centres
Canadian expatriate ice hockey players in Croatia
Canadian expatriate ice hockey players in Finland
Grizzlys Wolfsburg players
Ice hockey people from British Columbia
KHL Medveščak Zagreb players
Linköping HC players
San Diego Gulls (AHL) players
Surrey Eagles players
SaiPa players
Skellefteå AIK players
Sportspeople from Burnaby
Tappara players